The Andorra national roller hockey team is the national team side of Andorra at international roller hockey. Usually is part of FIRS Roller Hockey B World Cup and CERH European Roller Hockey Championship.

World Championship record

European Championship record

Titles
World Cup "B": (2)
1992, 2002

References

External links
website of Andorra Hockey Club

Roller hockey
National roller hockey (quad) teams